Annasagar may refer to any of the following places in Telangana state, India:

 Annasagar, Nizamabad, a village in Yellareddy mandal, Nizamabad district
 Annasagar, Ranga Reddy, a village in Yelal mandal, Ranga Reddy district
 Annasagar, Bhoothpur, a village in Bhoothpur mandal, Mahabubnagar district
 Annasagar, Damaragidda, a village in Damaragidda mandal, Mahabubnagar district

See also 
 Ana Sagar Lake, an artificial lake in Rajasthan state